Toxomerus occidentalis, is a species of flower fly found in western North America from British Columbia south to California, Colorado and Texas.

References

Diptera of North America
Syrphinae
Insects described in 1922